Narangodes is a genus of moths of the family Noctuidae. The genus was erected by George Hampson in 1910.

Species
 Narangodes argyrostrigatus Sugi, 1990
 Narangodes confluens Sugi, 1990
 Narangodes flavibasis Sugi, 1990
 Narangodes haemorranta Hampson, 1910
 Narangodes nigridiscata Swinhoe, 1901
 Narangodes nudariodes Hampson, 1918

References

Acontiinae